Stephen Daniel Double (born 19 December 1966) is a British Conservative Party politician. He has been the Member of Parliament (MP) for St Austell and Newquay since 2015. He has been serving as a junior Lord Commissioner of the Treasury since November 28, 2022.

Double served on Cornwall Council and as a town councillor and mayor of St Austell before his selection as Conservative candidate for St Austell and Newquay in the general election.

Early life and career
Double was born on 19 December 1966 in St Austell. The son of the evangelist Don Double, he was educated at Poltair School in the town. He worked in Cornwall across a variety of sectors, including working for a bank, local church and charity. From May 2001, he was Director of Bay Direct Media Ltd, a direct marketing company. In May 2011, he additionally became Director of Phoenix Corporate Ltd, a company selling branded merchandise; he remains as Director and primary shareholder of both companies since becoming an MP.

At its establishment in 2009, Double was one of four candidates elected onto St Austell Town Council for the Poltair Ward; he was re-elected in 2013 and served as deputy mayor of the town. He declined to stand at the following election in 2017, having since become an MP. Double was also elected as the Conservative Party candidate onto the new unitary Cornwall Council in 2009 for the St Austell Poltair division, but the seat was subsequently won by the Liberal Democrats candidate at the following election in 2013. Double did not stand for re-election to Cornwall Council in 2013.

Parliamentary career
Double was first elected as the Member of Parliament (MP) for St Austell and Newquay at the 2015 general election, when he defeated the incumbent Liberal Democrat Steve Gilbert. He was re-elected at the 2017 general election.

In Parliament, Double has joined twelve All Party Parliamentary Groups. He chairs the All Party Parliamentary Group Ocean Conservation, working with Cornish charity Surfers Against Sewage. The group has campaigned against marine litter and seeks to protect the coastline. He is also co-chair of the Regional Airports APPG which works to lobby government on behalf of small regional airports, such as Cornwall Airport Newquay.

Double is also vice-chair of the Parliamentary Beer Group which works to support pubs and breweries. In this role, he has been able to promote the work of St Austell Brewery, who operate from his constituency. He is also a member of the Ceramics All Party Parliamentary Group which represents the ceramics industry which includes China Clay. He also sits on the Parliamentary Space Committee where he has promoted Newquay as a frontrunner for the location of the UK's first spaceport. He is the vice-chair of the Parliamentary Group for Fatherhood.

Double has helped secure Government backing for a new link road between the A30 and St Austell. He has led several debates in Parliament on subjects ranging from school term time holiday rules to the cost of car insurance for young people.

Double supported Brexit in the 2016 EU membership referendum.

Double has served in Parliament as a Member of the Petitions Committee, the European Scrutiny Committee and the Transport Committee.	

In September 2017, Double was one of five MPs who backed the Government Departments (Abolition) Bill, which would have resulted in the abolition of the Department for International Development – effectively ending the management of UK aid to foreign countries. He also backed a Bill calling for a new bank holiday to celebrate Brexit.

In December 2018, during the no-confidence vote against Theresa May as leader of the party, Double said he would vote against the then-Prime Minister.

In August 2019, Double was appointed Parliamentary Private Secretary to the Department of Health and Social Care.

In December 2019, Double was re-elected as Member of Parliament for St Austell & Newquay with an increased majority of 16,526. He received 31,273 votes – up by 6.5 percentage points since his previous election in 2017.

On 17 September 2021, Double was appointed an Assistant Government Whip in the second cabinet reshuffle of the second Johnson ministry.

In July 2022, he was appointed Parliamentary Under-Secretary of State at the Department for Environment, Food and Rural Affairs. He was sacked in September 2022 by new Prime Minister Liz Truss. He joined a number of colleagues in calling for Truss's resignation, after confusion over a vote on fracking.

On 28 October 2022, Double was made Government Whip to the Ministry of Defence by new Prime Minister Rishi Sunak, and King Charles III accordingly named him a junior Lord Commissioner of the Treasury by letters patent dated November 28, 2022.

Personal life
Double has been married to Anne Bird since 1986; they have two sons. Double employs his wife as a Senior Caseworker on a salary up to £30,000. He was listed in an article in The Daily Telegraph which criticised the practice of MPs employing family members, on the lines that it promotes nepotism. Although MPs who were first elected in 2017 have been banned from employing family members, the restriction is not retrospective – meaning that Double's employment of his wife is lawful.

In June 2016, Double admitted an extra-marital affair with a married 26-year-old aide. Double had reportedly kept this secret from his wife of 30 years. The BBC later reported that Double's constituency party deputy chairman had resigned, suggesting Double, who had claimed to promote family life, should do the same. They also examined the public's changing view of morality and quoted political historian Matt Cole who said that whilst the public was now more tolerant of infidelity, it did object to hypocrisy.

Double is an evangelical Christian.

References

External links

1966 births
Conservative Party (UK) MPs for English constituencies
Living people
Conservative Party (UK) councillors
People from St Austell
People from Newquay
Members of Cornwall Council
Members of the Parliament of the United Kingdom for constituencies in Cornwall
British Eurosceptics
Place of birth missing (living people)
British environmentalists
UK MPs 2015–2017
UK MPs 2017–2019
UK MPs 2019–present